The Hadrumetum Punic inscriptions are Punic inscriptions found in the Old City of Sousse (ancient Hadrumetum).

They were discovered between the Great Mosque of Sousse and the Ribat of Sousse, where the French authorities had chosen to build Sousse's first church, the Église Notre-Dame-de-l'Immaculée-Conception de Sousse, built between 1865 and 1867. After WWII war damage was repaired, the church was later demolished by the local authorities as part of a renovation of the Old City.

The first nine inscriptions were published by Julius Euting in 1872. Further inscriptions were found in 1946 after World War II bomb damage exposed more of the area around the church.

The inscriptions are held between the Sousse Archaeological Museum, the Louvre and the Maison méditerranéenne des Sciences de l'homme.

Euting inscriptions
Euting bought the steles from Maltese masons at La Goulette (Tunis), who discovered them in 1867 during foundation work for a church in Sousse 7 meters underground. The church in was the Église Notre-Dame-de-l'Immaculée-Conception de Sousse, built between 1865 and 1867 by the French authorities as the first church in Sousse. After war damage was repaired, it was later demolished by the local authorities as part of a renovation of the Old City of Sousse.

Gallery

Truillot inscriptions
In 1946, Alexis Truillot, curator of the Sousse Archaeological Museum, took advantage of the excavations carried out at the church, following the destruction in the war, to attempt a survey of the site. Nine further Punic stelae were found, including three with inscriptions.

References

External link

Punic inscriptions
Archaeological discoveries in Tunisia
1867 archaeological discoveries
KAI inscriptions